Novation is a legal term in contract and business law.

Novation may also refer to:

Novation (Fringe), an episode of the Fringe television series
Novation CAT, a defunct early modem manufacturer
Novation Digital Music Systems, manufacturer of electronic musical equipment
Novation Supernova synthesizer
One of the predecessor companies of Vizient, Inc.

See also
Novatian, the third century Roman bishop and theologian